A solar power tower, also known as 'central tower' power plant or 'heliostat' power plant, is a type of solar furnace using a tower to receive focused sunlight. It uses an array of flat, movable mirrors (called heliostats) to focus the sun's rays upon a collector tower (the target). Concentrating Solar Power (CSP) systems are seen as one viable solution for renewable, pollution-free energy.

Early designs used these focused rays to heat water, and used the resulting steam to power a turbine. Newer designs using liquid sodium have been demonstrated, and systems using molten salts (40% potassium nitrate, 60% sodium nitrate) as the working fluids are now in operation. These working fluids have high heat capacity, which can be used to store the energy before using it to boil water to drive turbines. These designs also allow power to be generated when the sun is not shining.

Cost 

In 2021, the US National Renewable Energy Laboratory (NREL) estimated cost of electricity from concentrated solar with 10 hours of storage at $0.076 per kWh in 2021, $0.056 per kWh in 2030, and $0.052 per kWh in 2050. In 2007, companies such as ESolar (then backed by Google.org) were developing cheap, low maintenance, mass producible heliostat components that were to reduce costs in the near future. ESolar's design used large numbers of small mirrors (1.14 m2), to reduce costs for installing mounting systems such as concrete, steel, drilling, and cranes.  In October 2017, an article in GreenTech Media suggested that eSolar ceased business in late 2016.

Improvements in working fluid systems, such as moving from current two tank (hot/cold) designs to single tank thermocline systems with quartzite thermal fillers and oxygen blankets will improve material efficiency and reduce costs further.

Design 
 

 Some concentrating solar power towers are air-cooled instead of water-cooled, to avoid using limited desert water
 Flat glass is used instead of the more expensive curved glass
 Thermal storage to store the heat in molten salt containers to continue producing electricity while the sun is not shining
 Steam is heated to 500 °C to drive turbines that are coupled to generators which produce electricity
 Control systems to supervise and control all the plant activity including the heliostat array positions, alarms, other data acquisition and communication.

Environmental concerns 
There is evidence that such large area solar concentrating installations can melt birds that fly over them. Near the center of the array temperatures can reach 550 °C which, with the solar flux itself, is enough to incinerate birds while further away feathers are scorched leading to the eventual death of the bird. Workers at the Ivanpah solar power plant call these birds "streamers," as they ignite in midair and plummet to the ground trailing smoke. During testing of the initial standby position for the heliostats, 115 birds were killed as they entered the concentrated solar flux. During the first 6 months of operations, a total of 321 birds were killed. After altering the standby procedure to focus no more than four heliostats on any one point, there have been no further bird fatalities.

The Ivanpah Solar Power Facility is classified as a greenhouse gas emitter by the State of California because it has to burn fossil fuel for several hours each morning so that it can quickly reach its operating temperature.

Commercial applications 
Several companies have been involved in planning, designing, and building utility size power plants. There are numerous examples of case studies of applying innovative solutions to solar power. Beam-down (a variation of central receiver plants with Cassegrainian optics) tower application is also feasible with heliostats to heat the working fluid.

Novel applications 

The Pit Power Tower combines a solar power tower and an aero-electric power tower in a decommissioned open pit mine. Traditional solar power towers are constrained in size by the height of the tower and closer heliostats blocking the line of sight of outer heliostats to the receiver. The use of the pit mine's "stadium seating" helps overcome the blocking constraint.

As solar power towers commonly use steam to drive the turbines, and water tends to be scarce in regions with high solar energy, another advantage of open pits is that they tend to collect water, having been dug below the water table. The Pit Power Tower uses low heat steam to drive the pneumatic tubes in a co-generation system. A third benefit of re-purposing a pit mine for this kind of project is the possibility of reusing mine infrastructure such as roads, buildings and electricity.

Solar power towers

List of solar power towers

See also 
 Concentrated solar power
 Feed-in tariff
 List of concentrating solar thermal power companies
 List of solar thermal power stations
 National Solar Thermal Test Facility (NSTTF)
 Solar furnace
 Solar thermal energy

References 

Energy conversion
Solar thermal energy
Solar power